A referendum on the Insurance Law was held in Latvia on 24 and 25 February 1934. The referendum was initiated by the Latvian Social Democratic Workers' Party and its supporters and asked voters whether they approved of the law "On Provision in cases of old age, disability and unemployment", more commonly known as the Insurance Law. The law would provide social protection for the elderly, disabled and unemployed. Although it was passed by a wide margin, voter turnout was below the necessary threshold and the law was not passed by the Saeima.

Results

References

1934 referendums
1934 in Latvia
Referendums in Latvia
Retirement in Latvia